James Edgar may refer to:

 James David Edgar (1841–1899), Canadian politician
 James Edgar (entrepreneur) (1843–1909), Scottish-American founder of Edgar Department Stores and the first department store Santa Claus 
 James Douglas Edgar (1884–1921), English professional golfer
 Jim Edgar (born 1946), American politician
 Jimmy Edgar (born 1983), American electronic music artist
 James Edgar (footballer) (1882–?), English footballer